The Eastern Intercollegiate Baseball League was a baseball-only conference that existed from 1930 to 1992.  It consisted of the eight Ivy League schools along with Army and Navy.  The league disbanded after the 1992 season, when Army and Navy joined the Patriot League and the Ivy League began sponsoring baseball.

Former members

Notes

Membership timeline

Champions

Notes

References

Defunct college sports conferences in the United States
Defunct baseball leagues in the United States
Ivy League baseball
College baseball by conference in the United States
Sports leagues established in 1930
1930 establishments in the United States
Organizations disestablished in 1992
1992 disestablishments in the United States